Julia Dorothy Finn is an Australian politician who was elected to the New South Wales Legislative Assembly as the member for Granville for the Labor Party at the 2015 New South Wales state election.

Finn is a member of the NSW Socialist Left Faction. Finn voted no to the Reproductive Health Care Reform Bill 2019.

Finn served on Parramatta City Council from 1999 and was Lord Mayor in 2004-05 

Finn was appointed Shadow Minister for Consumer Protection and Shadow Minister for Carers in the McKay shadow cabinet in July 2019. In June 2020, Finn temporarily stepped down from her portfolios after she was named in an internal party investigation into branch stacking issues. McKay did not sack Finn and the latter officially remained a shadow minister.

References

 

Living people
Australian Labor Party members of the Parliament of New South Wales
Members of the New South Wales Legislative Assembly
Year of birth missing (living people)
Place of birth missing (living people)
21st-century Australian politicians
Mayors and Lord Mayors of Parramatta
Women members of the New South Wales Legislative Assembly
Women mayors of places in New South Wales
21st-century Australian women politicians